Boone Township may refer to the following townships in the United States:

 Boone Township, Boone County, Illinois
 Boone Township, Cass County, Indiana
 Boone Township, Crawford County, Indiana
 Boone Township, Dubois County, Indiana
 Boone Township, Harrison County, Indiana
 Boone Township, Madison County, Indiana
 Boone Township, Porter County, Indiana
 Boone Township, Dallas County, Iowa
 Boone Township, Hancock County, Iowa
 Boone Township, Wright County, Iowa
 Boone Township, Lake of the Woods County, Minnesota
 Boone Township, Wright County, Missouri

See also 
 East Boone Township, Bates County, Missouri
 West Boone Township, Bates County, Missouri
 Boon Township (disambiguation)